Paul Erdal (16 May 1902 – 8 February 1985) was a Norwegian boxer who competed in the 1920 Summer Olympics. In 1920 he was eliminated in the quarter-finals of the featherweight class. After a bye in the first round he won his fight against Frederick Adams in the second round but he lost his next bout to the future gold medalist Paul Fritsch.

References

External links
 list of Norwegian boxers

1902 births
1985 deaths
Featherweight boxers
Olympic boxers of Norway
Boxers at the 1920 Summer Olympics
Norwegian male boxers
20th-century Norwegian people